Blue Lake ( or Plavo jezero) is a karst lake located near Imotski in southern Croatia. Like the nearby Red Lake, it lies in a deep sinkhole possibly formed by the collapse of an enormous cave. In spring, when the snow from surrounding mountains melts, it can reach , and in 1914 it reached , overflowing the southern rim. The lake is a popular destination for hiking and sight-seeing.

At the end of the summer the lake may completely disappear.

In 1907 a road was built descending to the lake. In 1942, an earthquake caused a large rockfall, resulting in reduction of the lake's depth.

References

External links

Lakes of Croatia
Landforms of Split-Dalmatia County
Sinkholes of Europe
Imotski